Fritz Alexander Ernst Noether (7 October 1884 – 10 September 1941) was a Jewish German mathematician who emigrated from Nazi Germany to the Soviet Union. He was later executed by the NKVD.

Biography
Fritz Noether's father Max Noether was a mathematician and professor in Erlangen. The notable mathematician Emmy Noether was his elder sister. He had two sons, Herman D. Noether and Gottfried E. Noether. His eldest son Herman was a chemist. Gottfried was an American statistician and educator, and wrote a brief biography of his father.

Fritz Noether was also an able mathematician. Not allowed to work in Nazi Germany for being a Jew, he moved to the Soviet Union, where he was appointed to a professorship at the Tomsk State University.

In November 1937, during the Great Purge, he was arrested at his home in Tomsk by the NKVD. On 23 October 1938, Noether was sentenced to 25 years of imprisonment on charges of espionage and sabotage. He served time in different prisons. On 8 September 1941 the Military Collegium of the USSR Supreme Court sentenced Professor F. Noether to death on the accusation of "anti-Soviet propaganda". He was shot in Orel (Oryol) on 10 September 1941. His burial place is unknown, but there is a memorial plaque in the Gengenbach Cemetery, Germany, at the site of his wife's grave.

On 22 Dec 1988, the Plenum of the USSR Supreme Court ruled that Professor Fritz M. Noether had been convicted on groundless charges and voided his sentence, thus fully rehabilitating him.

See also
Herglotz–Noether theorem

References

External links
Photograph of Fritz Noether and Emmy Noether, 1933.
Photographs of Fritz Noether at MFO

1884 births
1941 deaths
People from the Kingdom of Bavaria
People from Erlangen
Jewish refugees from Nazi Germany in the Soviet Union
20th-century German mathematicians
Academic staff of the Karlsruhe Institute of Technology
Academic staff of the University of Breslau
Academic staff of Tomsk State University
Great Purge victims from Germany
Jews executed by the Soviet Union
Executed people from Bavaria